Tatiana Popova (born 17 September 1984) is a Russian professional basketball player. She plays for Russia women's national basketball team. She competed in the 2012 Summer Olympics.

References 

Living people
Russian women's basketball players
1984 births